Rajavin Parvaiyile is a 1995 Indian Tamil-language romantic drama film, directed by Janaki Soundar, starring  Vijay, Indraja and Ajith Kumar. The film revolves around Gowri, a rich man's daughter in the village, falls for Raja, an ambitious college going guy with poor family background. When Raja continues to avoid Gowri, she begins to investigate why he is not interested in her.

The film released on 5 August 1995. It was a below average at the box office.

Synopsis
Raja (Vijay) is the son of a poor family, and his only aim in life is to study to get a good job. Meanwhile, Gowri (Indraja), the daughter of the richest man (Janagaraj) of the village, falls in love with Raja, but he keeps shunning her and getting away from her. She decides to know the reason for his behavior. Raja narrates the story of his friend Chandru's (Ajith Kumar) unsuccessful love story with Shanthi (Gayathri Shastri), and Chandru ended up committing suicide after his lover's marriage, so Raja began to hate love. Raja later falls in love with Gowri; meanwhile, issues of class arise in the village forms rest of the plot.

Cast
 Vijay as Raja
 Indraja as Gowri
 Ajith Kumar as Chandru
 Vadivelu as Arivazhagan
 Janagaraj as Pannaiyar
 Vadivukkarasi as Rassamma
 Gayathri Shastry as Shanthi
 Charuhasan as Shanthi's father
 Sathyapriya as Pannaiyar's wife
 Kumarimuthu as Kamalakannan
 Vennira Aadai Moorthy as Schoolteacher
 Singamuthu as School teacher
 Maghima Devi as School teacher
 Mohan Natarajan
 Balaguru

Production
The film notably featured Ajith and Vijay together at an early stage of their careers in the mid-90s, with the pair later going on to become two heroes working in the in Indian cinema.

Soundtrack

References

External links 
 

1995 films
Indian romantic drama films
Films shot in Chennai
Films scored by Ilaiyaraaja
1990s Tamil-language films
1995 romantic drama films